Vigerslev is a working-class neighborhood and is part of Valby, Copenhagen, Denmark. The area is dominated by a large industrial zone, apartment buildings (5–6 floors) and few single-family houses.

The area is connected with F-train (Vigerslev Allé station).

Valby